Seguam may refer to:

Seguam Island, an island in the Andreanof Islands in the Aleutian Islands in Alaska.
Seguam Pass, a strait between Amlia Island and Seguam Island in the Aleutian Islands in Alaska.